Yupik may refer to:
 Yupik peoples, a group of indigenous peoples of Alaska and the Russian Far East
 Yupik languages, a group of Eskimo-Aleut languages

Yupꞌik (with the apostrophe) may refer to:
 Yup'ik people, a Yupik people from western and southwestern Alaska
 Yup'ik language, their language
 Yup'ik syllabary, a writing system formerly used for the language

Language and nationality disambiguation pages